Sweater is the debut extended play by Australian band, Eskimo Joe, released in April 1998. The EP peaked at number 90 on the ARIA singles chart.

The title track "Sweater" received significant airplay on Australian youth radio station Triple J, reaching #33 on Triple J's Hottest 100 of 1998.

Track listing

Charts

Release history

References

Eskimo Joe albums
EPs by Australian artists
1998 debut EPs